Michael Joseph Anderson Jr. (born 6 August 1943) is an actor whose 40-year career includes roles in The Sundowners, In Search of the Castaways, The Sons of Katie Elder, and Logan's Run. During the 1966 television season he starred as Clayt Monroe in The Monroes.

Early life
Anderson was born in Hillingdon, England on 6 August 1943, the son of Betty Jordan and film director Michael Anderson. He grew up wanting to act in his father's films. He studied drama and ballet at Arts Educational Schools, London, and by the age of 8 began performing on live radio and television shows. He also danced with the London Festival Ballet, now the English National Ballet.

American acting career
Anderson's first major American film was The Sundowners (1960). In 1962 he was cast as John Glenarvan in the Walt Disney film In Search of the Castaways.

From 7 September 1966, to 30 August 1967, Anderson played 18-year-old Clayt Monroe, one of five orphaned siblings, in the ABC Western series The Monroes. Before the series filming began it was reported that Anderson "spent five months getting rid of his English accent."

In 1976 Anderson finally had a chance to act in one of his father's films, playing Doc in Logan's Run.

Personal life
Anderson married three times. From 1966 to 1973 he was married to Victoria Harrington. They had three children. From 1976 to 1984 he was married Maria O’Brien. They had one child. From 1986 to 1990 he was married to Marina Anderson.

On 12 December 1988 Anderson became a naturalized United States citizen and retired from acting in 1998.

Filmography

The Moonraker (1958) – Martin Strangeways 
Tiger Bay (1959) – Youth (uncredited)
The Sundowners (1960) – Sean Carmody
Play It Cool (1962) – Alvin
Reach for Glory (1962) – Lewis Craig
In Search of the Castaways (1962) – John Glenarvan
Dear Heart (1964) – Patrick
The Greatest Story Ever Told (1965) – James the Younger
Major Dundee (1965) – Tim Ryan
The Sons of Katie Elder (1965) – Bud Elder
The Glory Guys (1965) – Pvt. Martin Hale
The Monroes (1966) – Clayt Monroe
WUSA (1970) – Marvin
The House That Would Not Die (1970) – Stan Whitman
'   Hawaii Five-O TV Serial Season 3 Episode To Kill or Be Killed (1971) – Michael Rigney
The Last Movie (1971) – Mayor's Son
In Search of America (TV Movie – 1971) – J.J.
The Family Rico (TV Movie – 1972) – Georgie
The Daughters of Joshua Cabe (TV Movie – 1972) – Cole Wetherall
Coffee, Tea or Me? (TV Movie 1973) – Tommy Byrnes 
 Hawaii Five-O TV Serial Season 4 Episode – Sunday Torch (1973) – Ray Stokely Evel Knievel (TV Movie – 1974) – Darrell PettetShootout in a One-Dog Town (1974) – Billy BoyLogan's Run (1976) – DocFantasy Island – TV serial, ep. "The Over-the-Hill Caper/Poof!You're a Movie Star" (1978)
Nightkill (1980) – Lt. Donner
The Martian Chronicles (TV Miniseries – 1980) – David Lustig
The Million Dollar Face (TV Movie 1981) 
CHiPs (TV Series – 1981, Season 5 Episode 25) – Lucas
Making of a Male Model (1983) – Sven
Love Leads the Way: A True Story (TV Movie – 1984) – Hank
Highway To Heaven (TV Series – 1986, Season 2 Episode 19) – Tom Ward
Sunset Grill (1993) – Lt. Jeff Carruthers
Dieppe (TV Movie – 1993) – David Lean
Rent-a-Kid (1995) – Mr. Nicely
Terminal Rush (1996) – Harrison Dekker
Undue Influence (TV Movie – 1996) – Funeral Priest
Elvis Meets Nixon (TV Movie – 1997) – Secret Service Agent #2
Rescuers: Stories of Courage: Two Families (TV movie – 1998) – Lieutenant Von Meyer

References

Further reading

External links 

 

1943 births
Male actors from Los Angeles
English male film actors
English male television actors
Living people
English emigrants to the United States
People from Hillingdon
Male actors from London